Outcast is a 1928 silent film drama produced and distributed by First National Pictures. It was directed by William A. Seiter and stars Corinne Griffith, often considered one of the most beautiful women in film. This story had been filmed in 1917 as The World and the Woman with Jeanne Eagels.  In 1922 a Paramount film of the same name with Elsie Ferguson reprising her stage role was released. Both films were based on a 1914 play, Outcast, by Hubert Henry Davies which starred Ferguson. The Seiter/Griffith film was an all silent with Vitaphone music and sound effects. In the sound era the story was filmed once again as The Girl from 10th Avenue starring Bette Davis. According to the Library of Congress database shows a print surviving complete at Cineteca Italiana in Milan.

Cast
Corinne Griffith as Miriam
James Ford as Tony
Edmund Lowe as Geoffrey
Huntley Gordon as Hugh
Kathryn Carver as Valentine
Louise Fazenda as Mabel
Claude King as Moreland
Sam Hardy as Jack
Patsy O'Byrne as Mrs. O'Brien
Lee Moran as Fred

Preservation status
Print exists in Cineteca Italiana, Italian archive Milan.

See also
The World and the Woman (1916)
Outcast (1917)
Outcast (1922)
The Girl from 10th Avenue (1935)

References

External links

lobby poster
 Louise Fazenda and Corinne Griffith

1928 films
American silent feature films
Films directed by William A. Seiter
American films based on plays
First National Pictures films
American black-and-white films
Silent American drama films
1928 drama films
1920s American films